Swear or Swearing may refer to:
Making an oath, also known as swearing an oath
Profanity
 "Swear" (The Walking Dead), a 2016 television episode of The Walking Dead

Music
"Swear" (Tim Scott McConnell song), a 1980s pop song, single for Sheena Easton 1985
"Swear" (Alan song), a j-pop song by Alan Dawa Dolma from the album My Life
"I Swear", a song by John Michael Montgomery, later covered by All-4-One
Swear, an early 1980’s instrumental song by Japanese fusion jazz band Casiopea

See also
Swearer (disambiguation)
I Swear (disambiguation)